Artur Valeryevich Dmitriev (born 21 January 1968) is a Russian former pair skater who competed internationally for the Soviet Union, the Unified Team, and Russia. He is a two-time Olympic champion, having won gold with Natalia Mishkutionok in 1992 and with Oksana Kazakova in 1998. He and Mishkutionok also won Olympic silver in 1994. Dmitriev is the only male pair skater to win the Olympics with two different partners.

Personal life 
Artur Valeryevich Dmitriev was born on 21 January 1968 to Russian parents in Bila Tserkva, Ukrainian SSR, Soviet Union. He was raised in Norilsk, Russian SFSR. From 1992 to 2006, Dmitriev was married to rhythmic gymnast Tatiana Druchinina; their son, Artur Jr, was born on 7 September 1992 in Saint Petersburg, Russia. Dmitriev is remarried to an accountant, Tatiana Fedorova, with whom he has a son named Artiom.

Career 
Dmitriev began skating in 1975. He teamed up with Natalia Mishkutionok around 1986. They were coached by Tamara Moskvina in Saint Petersburg and their choreographers were Alexander Matveev with Moskvina. They won the gold medal at the 1992 Olympics, and the silver at the 1994 Olympics behind Ekaterina Gordeeva / Sergei Grinkov. They represented the Unified Team, the sports team of the former Soviet Union during the 1992 Olympics, but represented Russia in 1994. Mishkutionok/Dmitriev won the World Figure Skating Championships and the European Championships in 1991 and 1992. Mishkutionok decided to retire from competition in 1994.

Dmitriev wanted to continue his competitive career and found a new partner, Oksana Kazakova, in February 1995. They were coached by Moskvina at Yubileyny Sports Palace in Saint Petersburg. Their choreographers were Alexander Matveev, David Avdish, and Moskvina. Early in their partnership, Kazakova/Dmitriev missed six months when she injured her leg. They won the 1996 European Championships and bronze at the 1997 World Championships. In 1998, they won the Olympic title in Nagano, Japan. This made Dmitriev the first male skater to win the pairs event twice with different partners. The pair retired from competition but continued to skate in shows.

Despite being close competitive rivals, he was friends with both Grinkov and Sikharulidze. He helped Moskvina coach Sikharulidze even while they were competing against each other.

Dmitriev later became a coach. He spent a few years coaching at Hackensack, New Jersey's Ice House. Dmitriev began coaching at Yubileyny in the mid-2000s, working alongside Kazakova and Moskvina and coaching Katarina Gerboldt / Alexander Enbert among others. In March 2012, Dmitriev said he would move to Moscow and coach at the UOR 4 Moscow Gomelski Academy at the Mechta rink. He works with Natalia Pavlova in Moscow.

Dmitriev's current students include: 
 Kristina Astakhova / Alexei Rogonov 
 Elizaveta Martynova / Roman Zaporozhets 
 Elizaveta Botyakova / Maxim Bobrov 
 Elena Ivanova / Nikita Rakhmanin

Programs

With Mishkutionok

With Kazakova

Competitive highlights

With Mishkutionok 

Professional

With Kazakova 
CS: Champions Series (later Grand Prix)

References

External links

 
 Kazakova and Dmitriev at The Figure Skating Corner

Navigation

1968 births
Russian male pair skaters
Soviet male pair skaters
Olympic figure skaters of the Unified Team
Olympic figure skaters of Russia
Figure skaters at the 1992 Winter Olympics
Figure skaters at the 1994 Winter Olympics
Figure skaters at the 1998 Winter Olympics
Olympic gold medalists for the Unified Team
Olympic gold medalists for Russia
Olympic silver medalists for Russia
Living people
People from Bila Tserkva
Olympic medalists in figure skating
World Figure Skating Championships medalists
European Figure Skating Championships medalists
Medalists at the 1998 Winter Olympics
Medalists at the 1994 Winter Olympics
Medalists at the 1992 Winter Olympics
Universiade medalists in figure skating
Goodwill Games medalists in figure skating
Universiade gold medalists for the Soviet Union
Competitors at the 1989 Winter Universiade
Competitors at the 1990 Goodwill Games
Competitors at the 1994 Goodwill Games